Batesia is a genus of flowering plants in the legume family, Fabaceae. It belongs to the subfamily Caesalpinioideae.

References

Cassieae
Fabaceae genera